The Paradies Glacier is a 2.27 km long glacier (2007) situated in the Lepontine Alps in the canton of Graubünden in Switzerland. In 1973 it had an area of 3.99 km2.

See also
List of glaciers in Switzerland
Swiss Alps

External links
Swiss glacier monitoring network

Glaciers of Graubünden
Lepontine Alps